Streptopetalum hildebrandtii is a perennial herb native to the grasslands of Kenya and Tanzania, Africa. It is found at altitudes of 1000-1250m. 

Streptopetalum hildebrandtii grows up to 0.4 m tall, has 3-7 cm leaves, and homostylous yellow and orange flowers.

References 

Passifloraceae